Emilio Fermín Mignone (July 23, 1922 - December 21, 1998) was a "central figure of the most transcendental social movement of the last quarter of the twentieth century in Argentina, the human rights movement" that strengthened and developed in the struggle against Argentina's military dictatorship of 1976-1983 and its aftermath. He died of cancer in Buenos Aires at the age of 76.

Early life

Emilio F. Mignone was born in Luján, Buenos Aires. He was educated as a lawyer, as the inaugural President of the National University of Luján.

Career
Mignone spent 6 years from 1963 to 1969 as Argentina's representative  to the OAS, Organization of American States, in Washington DC. He returned to Argentina and was the under-secretary of Education in the Peronist government.
In 1976, Mignone was a practising lawyer in Argentina.  His daughter Monica was one of many Argentinians who disappeared after being kidnapped and taken to a government facility.
Mignone was the founder and President of Center for Legal and Social Studies (CELS) Argentine human rights organization (1979) along with five other people who had evidence that their children were victims of state terrorism during the last Argentine military dictatorship. He served as CELS president from 1979 until his death in 1998.

The Emilio Mignone International Human Rights Prize has been created in his name. in 2007, by the Ministry of Foreign Affairs of Argentina.

References

Argentine human rights activists
1922 births
1998 deaths